Shukrullo Raxmatovich Mirsaidov (14 February 1939 in Leninabad, Tajik SSR, Soviet Union – 1 November 2012, in Cyrillic Uzbek: Шукрулло Рахматович Мирсаидов; in Russian: Шукрулла Рахметович Мирсаидов Shukrulla Rakhmatovich Mirsaidov; his first name is often shortened as Shukur) was a politician in Uzbekistan and the 1st vice president of Uzbekistan from March 1990 until the abolishment of the office on 8 January 1992.

Formerly mayor of Tashkent and a key ally of the first Uzbek President Islam Karimov, Mirsaidov had served as the last Chairman of the Council of Ministers (prime minister) of the Uzbek SSR (1990) and then as Vice President of Uzbekistan until Karimov abolished this office on 8 January 1992.

Mirsaidov criticised Karimov's administration, posing the most significant political threat to the administration at that time. Before his resignation, he sent an open letter to Karimov stating, "democracy and a policy of openness are being replaced by an authoritarian regime." In 1993, he formed the Forum of Democratic Forces as an attempt to unite parties opposed to Karimov's rule. It was unsuccessful. Mirsaidov created a new party, Adolat (Justice) in December 1994, calling for liberal economic reforms, political pluralism and secularism.

Mirsaidov died in Tashkent at the age of 73 on 1 November 2012. According to some reports, his death was caused by a heart attack. Mirsaidov spent the rest of his life in Tashkent as an ordinary retiree, is said to have suffered from heart disease. Mirsaidov buried in the Teshik Kapak Cemetery in Tashkent.

References

Nations in Transit 1998: Country Report of Uzbekistan (PDF)

1939 births
2012 deaths
Vice presidents of Uzbekistan
People from Khujand
Soviet politicians
Mirsaidov, Shakrulla
Mayors of places in Uzbekistan
Recipients of the Order of Friendship of Peoples
Central Committee of the Communist Party of the Soviet Union members
Heads of government of the Uzbek Soviet Socialist Republic